In Celtic polytheism, Sirona was a goddess worshipped predominantly in East Central Gaul and along the Danubian limes. A healing deity, she was associated with healing springs; her attributes were snakes and eggs. She was sometimes depicted with Apollo Grannus or Apollo Borvo.  She was particularly worshipped by the Treveri in the Moselle Valley.

Sirona's name
The name of the goddess was written in various ways: Sirona, Đirona, Thirona, indicating some difficulty in capturing the initial sound in the Latin alphabet. The symbol Đ is used here to represent the tau gallicum, an additional letter used in Gaulish representing the cluster ts which was interchangeable with st- in word-initial position and it is not a form of the letter "D".
The root is a long vowel Gaulish variant of proto-Celtic *ster- (*h2ster) meaning ‘star’. The same root is found in Old Irish as ser, Welsh seren, Middle Cornish sterenn and Breton steren(n).
The name Đirona consists of a long-vowel, o-grade stem tsīro- derived from the root *ster- and a -no- suffix forming adjectives indicating "a belonging" in many Indo-European languages. Alternatively it may be an augmentative -on- suffix found in many Celtic divine names and epithets. To this is suffixed the Gaulish feminine singular -a, the usual feminine variant of o-stem adjectives and nouns. So *Tsīrona would seem to have meant ‘stellar’ or ‘astral’.

Evidence for Sirona

The evidence for Sirona is both epigraphic (inscriptions) and representational (sculptures and statues). As the map shows, it is primarily concentrated in east-central Gaul, up to the Germanic lines, and along the Danubian limes as far east as Budapest. A few outliers are seen in Aquitaine, Brittany, and one in Italy. There are no Sirona finds in Britannia, Hispania, or in any of the other Roman provinces.

Inscriptions

More usually, Sirona is paired with Apollo, as in this inscription from Graux  in the Vosges mountains:

Apollini et Si/ronae / Biturix Iulii f(ilius) / d(edit)

or this inscription from Luxeuil-les-Bains in Franche-Comté :

Apollini / et Sironae / idem / Taurus

When paired with Sirona, Apollo is often assimilated with a Gaulish deity, such as Apollo Borvo or Apollo Grannus. An example from Sarmizegetusa in Dacia :

Apollini / Granno et / Sironae / C(aius) Sempronius / Urbanus / proc(urator) Aug(usti)

and another from Augsburg  where Sirona is given the epithet sancta (holy) and is identified with Diana:

Apollini / Granno / Dianae / [s]anct(a)e Siron(a)e / [p]ro sal(ute) sua / suorumq(ue) / omn(ium) / Iulia Matrona

A dedication from Großbottwar in Baden-Württemberg  can be precisely dated to the year 201 CE by mention of the two consuls, L. Annius Fabianus and M. Nonius Arrius Mucianus:

In h(onorem) d(omus) d(ivinae) Apo[lli]ni et Sironae / aedem cum signis C(aius) Longinius / Speratus vet(eranus) leg(ionis) XXII Pr(imigeniae) P(iae) F(idelis) et Iunia Deva coniunx et Lon/gini Pacatus Martinula Hila/ritas Speratianus fili(i) in / suo posuerunt v(otum) s(olverunt) l(ibentes) l(aeti) m(erito) / Muciano et Fabiano co(n)s(ulibus)

Depictions

At the sulphur springs of Alzey in Rhineland-Palatinate, Germany, a stone bas-relief shows Sirona wearing a long gown and carrying a patera in her right hand and a sceptre in her left. The identification as Sirona is assured by a dedication to Apollo and Sirona.

The richly furnished spring sanctuary of Hochscheid (Cueppers 1990; Weisgerber 1975) was decorated with statues of Sirona and Apollo, again confirmed by an inscription  Deo Apolli/ni et sanc/t(a)e Siron(a)e ... (to Apollo and holy Sirona ...). The statue of Sirona shows her carrying a bowl of eggs (Green 1986 p. 162) and holding a long snake coiled around her lower arm (a link to the iconography of the Greek healing goddess Hygeia, daughter of Asklepios). She wears a long gown and has a star-shaped diadem on her head (a link with the meaning of the name Sirona).

A bronze statue from Mâlain in the Côte d'Or and dating to around 280 CE (Deyts & Roussel 1994; Deyts 1998) shows Sirona naked to the waist and holding a snake draped over her left arm, together with a very classical Apollo with lyre. The inscription ( ILingons-M, 00002) is Thiron(a) et Apollo.

A stone with an engraved bust of Sirona from Saint-Avold, now in the Musée de Metz, bears an inscription:
Deae Đironae/ Maior Ma/giati filius / v(otum) s(olvit) l(ibens) m(erito).

At Vienne-en-Val in the Loiret, a square stone pillar depicts Sirona, Apollo, Minerva and Hercules (Debal 1973).  Sirona wears a long dress and a diadem, from which falls a veil. Her left hand holds a cornucopia and in her right is a patera which she is offering to a coiled snake. Again there is a similarity with Hygeia, who also carries a snake. Indeed, when a statue has no inscription, it is not clear whether Sirona or Hygeia is depicted, a syncretism demonstrated by the inscription at Wein which includes Sirona and Aesculapius, the Roman form of Asklepios:
[I(ovi)] O(ptimo) M(aximo) / Apollini / et Sirona[e] / [Ae]sculap[io] / P(ublius) Ael(ius) Luciu/s |(centurio) leg(ionis) X v(otum) s(olvit) / l(ibens) l(aetus) m(erito)

A different aspect of Sirona is shown at Sainte-Fontaine, where Sirona holds fruit and corn (Green 1986 p. 161).

Temples

Several temples to Sirona are known. Often these were of the Gallo-Roman fanum type, an inner [cella] with an outer walkway or pronaos, and were constructed around thermal springs or wells, as at Augst (Bakker 1990) and Oppenheim-Nierstein (Cüppers 1990).

At Budapest (in antiquity, Aquincum) a healing shrine at the spring which fed the aqueduct was dedicated to Apollo (presumably Grannus) and Sirona

Apolini /et/Serana(e)/ T(itus)Iul(ius) MER/CATOR D(e)C(urio)/V[1]LM

It was established by the emperor Caracalla when he visited Pannonia, although Dio Cassius says (Roman Histories, 78.15) that the emperor

received no help from Apollo Grannus, nor yet from Aesculapius or Serapis, in spite of his many supplications and his unwearying persistence.

Two inscriptions describe the establishment of temples to Sirona. From Ihn-Niedaltdorf an inscription records the donation of a building and its furnishings at the dedicant's expense:

De[ae Sirona]e / aedem [cum suis or]na/mentis M[3] v(otum) s(olvit) l(ibens) l(aetus) m(erito)

At Wiesbaden in Hesse (in antiquity, Aquae Mattiacorum) an inscription records the restoration of a temple by a curator at his own expense:

Sironae / C(aius) Iuli(us) Restitutus / c(urator) templ(i) d(e) s(uo) p(osuit)

It seems possible that another Wiesbaden inscription that the wife of military commander Porcius Rufianus from Mainz dedicated to an otherwise unknown goddess ""Diana Mattiaca"" for the healing of her daughter Porcia Rufiana, also refers to Sirona:

Antonia Postuma / T(iti) Porci Rufiani leg(ati) / [l]eg(ionis) XXII P(rimigeniae) P(iae) F(idelis) [pro sa]lu/te Porciae Rufianae / filiae suae Dianae Mat/tiacae [ex] voto / signum posu[it]

An elaborate shrine and temple complex at Hochscheid (Cüppers 1990) has already been mentioned. It was built in the second century CE around a spring, which filled a cistern in the temple. The remote location is thought to have been a pilgrimage site (Weisgerber 1975). It was destroyed in the third century, probably during the Germanic incursions of 250-270, and was never rebuilt.

References in popular culture
Food historian William Woys Weaver traces the origin of the pretzel to the worship of Sirona.

There is a song dedicated to Sirona written and performed by Gavin Dunne, better known by the name of his music project Miracle of Sound.

The curator of Wiesbaden's temple of Sirona, Iulius Restitutus, is one protagonist of the 21st-century Romanike novels.

The 2023 video game Hogwarts Legacy contains a transgender character with the first name Sirona. She is the owner of The Three Broomsticks tavern in Hogsmeade.

See also
 116 Sirona, an asteroid named in her honour
 Sirona, a song based on the deity by Irish musician Miracle of Sound

References

 Année Epigraphique (AE), yearly volumes.
 Corpus Inscriptionum Latinarum (CIL) vol XIII, Inscriptiones trium Galliarum et Germaniarum
 Cüppers, H. (ed) (1990). Die Römer in Rheinland-Pfalz. Theiss. 
 Delamarre, X. (2003). Dictionnaire de la langue gauloise (2nd ed.). Paris: Editions Errance. 
 Debal, J. (1983) Vienne-en-Val, Divinites et sanctuaires. Bulletin de la Société Archéologique et Historique de l'Orléanais, 42
 Deyts, S; Roussel, L. (1994) Mâlain, fouilles de Mediolanum: découverte, en juillet 1993, d'un buste de divinité de l'eau dans son contexte. Revue archéologique de l'Est et du Centre-Est - Dijon, 45 pp. 503–509
 Deyts, S. (1998). A la rencontre des dieux gaulois, un défi à César. Paris: Réunion des Musées Nationaux.
 Dio Cassius, Roman Histories. Earnest Cary (trans), Loeb Classical Library. Available online
 Eska, J. F.  (1998). Tau Gallicum. Studia Celtica 32 pp. 115–127
 Green, M. (1986). Gods of the Celts. Gloucestershire: Sutton Publishing Limited. . (Page numbering in reference above is to the 1986 edition, not the 2004 edition)
 Hamp, E.P. (1994). Incidence of Gaulish divine names in -on-. Studia Celtica Japonica NS 4, pp. 71–72.
 Jufer, N.; Luginbühl, T. (2001) Répertoire des dieux gaulois. Paris, Editions Errance. 
 Markey, T.L. (2001). 'Ingvaeonic' *sterir 'star' and astral priests. NOWELE 39 pp. 85–113.
 Mees, B. (2002). On Gaulish tau. Studia Celtica 36, pp. 21–26.
 Weisgerber, G. (1975). Das Pilgerheiligtum des Apollo und der Sirona von Hochscheid im Hunsruck. Bonn: Rudolf Habelt Press.

External links

 
 Alzey sculpture (in German, illustrated) - includes an unreferenced woodcut of a temple to Apollo and Sirona
 Vienne-en-Val sculptures (in French, illustrated).

Gaulish goddesses
Health goddesses
Water goddesses
Snake goddesses

ca:Mitologia celta#Déus